Katharina Bergobzoomová (1755- 1788) was a Czech opera singer. 

Bergobzoomová toured Europe between 1770 and 1788, performing at the Italian Vienna opera, the Duchy of Brunswick court theatre and the Estates Theatre in Prague. She was one of the first Czech opera singers.

References 

 Starší divadlo v českých zemích do konce 18. století. Osobnosti a díla, ed. A. Jakubcová, Praha: Divadelní ústav – Academia 2007
 http://encyklopedie.idu.cz/index.php/Bergobzoomov%C3%A1,_Katharina

1755 births
1788 deaths
18th-century Bohemian women opera singers